Iona Catholic Secondary School is a Catholic secondary school in the Dufferin-Peel Catholic District School Board. It provides education to students from the Clarkson and Lorne Park areas of Mississauga, Ontario.

Elementary feeder schools
 St. Christopher's Elementary School
 St. Helen Elementary School
 St. Luke's Elementary School
 St. Francis of Assisi Elementary School
 St. Louis Elementary School 
As well as others in the area.

Arts program
In 2007 Iona began the Regional Arts Program for grade nine students, allowing them to take Drama, Dance, Art or Music as their major. Students submit portfolios, get interviewed and perform to be considered for entry. Iona hosts Arts Night in the Mississauga Living Arts Centre.

SHSM programs
The school currently offers three Specialist High Skill Majors, including Art, Justice, and Business (Marketing). Students enter the program in grade 11 and take a number of mandatory courses and certifications, resulting in a special designation on their Ontario Secondary School Diploma.

Sports
In 2011, The boys' baseball team won the ROPSSAA (Region of Peel) title, the first baseball title won by the school.

In 2012, The girls' soccer team won the OFSSA (Ontario) title in Hamilton, the first soccer title won by the school.

Notable alumni
Matt Stajan, former NHL player 
Jack Hughes, current NHL player 
Quinn Hughes, current NHL player 
Katie Vincent, Olympic canoe sprint medalist

See also
List of high schools in Ontario

References

External links
 Dufferin-Peel website
 Iona website

High schools in Mississauga
Catholic secondary schools in Ontario
Art schools in Canada
Educational institutions established in 1993
1993 establishments in Ontario